Mount Airy is a town in Habersham County, Georgia, United States. The population was 1,284 at the 2010 census, up from 604 at the 2000 census.

History
The Georgia General Assembly incorporated Mount Airy as a town in 1874. The town's name may be descriptive or a transfer from Mount Airy, North Carolina.

Lawton Place, a historic house once lived in by Ty Cobb, is listed on the National Register of Historic Places.

Geography
It is bordered to the west by the city of Cornelia and to the south by Chattahoochee National Forest. The town sits on top of the Eastern Continental Divide, with Camp Creek, draining the northern half of town, flowing north to Hazel Creek and the Soquee River, a tributary of the Chattahoochee River, and ultimately the Gulf of Mexico, while the southern half of town drains to Nancy Town Creek, then the Middle Fork of the Broad River and eventually the Savannah River, which flows to the Atlantic Ocean.

Demographics

As of the census of 2000, there were 604 people, 235 households, and 179 families residing in the town. The racial makeup of the town was 92.38% White, 2.32% African American, 0.17% Native American, 2.81% Asian, 0.99% from other races, and 1.32% from two or more races. Hispanic or Latino people of any race were 2.65% of the population.

There were 235 households, out of which 30.6% had children under the age of 18 living with them, 58.7% were married couples living together, 11.9% had a female householder with no husband present, and 23.8% were non-families. 21.3% of all households were made up of individuals, and 7.7% had someone living alone who was 65 years of age or older. The average household size was 2.57 and the average family size was 2.95.

In the town, the population was spread out, with 23.2% under the age of 18, 8.3% from 18 to 24, 31% from 25 to 44, 23.2% from 45 to 64, and 14.4% who were 65 years of age or older. The median age was 38 years. For every 100 females, there were 105.4 males. For every 100 females age 18 and over, there were 100 males.

The median income for a household in the town was $42,813, and the median income for a family was $45,375. Males had a median income of $27,083 versus $23,500 for females. The per capita income for the town was $18,493.  About 3.5% of families and 4.8% of the population were below the poverty line, including 3.9% of those under age 18 and 2.8% of those age 65 or over.

References

Towns in Habersham County, Georgia
Towns in Georgia (U.S. state)